The 2007 Asian Archery Championships was the 15th edition of the event. It was held in Xi'an, China from 14 to 20 September 2007 and was organized by Asian Archery Federation.

Medal summary

Recurve

Compound

Medal table

References

 Complete results

Asian Championship
A
A
Asian Archery Championships